Changshou Road is an interchange station on Line 7 and Line 13 of the Shanghai Metro, located in Putuo District. It opened in 2009. In December 2014, the station became a transfer station when the first extension of Line 13 opened. There are five exits located on the Changshou Road and Changde Road intersection. The station serves the southern central Putuo District and bordering Jing'an District. The station also served as the eastern terminus of Line 13 from 28 December 2014, when it was extended eastward from Jinshajiang Road, until 19 December 2015, when it was extended to Shibo Avenue.

Station Layout

Around the station
 Huxi Mosque

References

Railway stations in Shanghai
Line 7, Shanghai Metro
Line 13, Shanghai Metro
Shanghai Metro stations in Putuo District
Railway stations in China opened in 2009